William H. Jackson may refer to:

 William Harding Jackson (1901–1971), U.S. National Security Advisor, 1956
 William Henry Jackson (1843–1942), early photographer of the American West
 William Henry Jackson (priest) (1889–1931), Anglican priest, missionary, and inventor of Burmese Braille
 William Hicks Jackson (1835–1903), Confederate general from Tennessee  
 William Humphreys Jackson (1839–1915), U.S. Representative from Maryland, 1901–1905, 1907–1909

See also
 William Jackson (disambiguation)